"Blues Run the Game" is a 1965 song by the American singer-songwriter Jackson C. Frank. It was the opening track on his self-titled debut album.

Cultural impact 
Samples of the Jackson C. Frank original appear on the soundtrack of This Is Us, S01E03, "Kyle," and the full song is heard in the 2018 film, The Old Man and the Gun and in the 7th episode of the second season of "Britannia". The cover version of this song by Simon and Garfunkel appears in the PBS documentary The Vietnam War by Ken Burns, in season 1: episode 7.

Cover versions 
The song has been performed by various other artists, such as Simon and Garfunkel (on the CD box set Old Friends), Sandy Denny, Nick Drake (on Family Tree), John Renbourn and Eddi Reader, and later by Bert Jansch, Counting Crows, John Mayer, Colin Meloy, Robin Pecknold, Headless Heroes, Mark Lanegan, Laura Marling Jack Steadman from Bombay Bicycle Club, Mauricio A. Reyes,  Martin Simpson, and Wizz Jones (on Lucky The Man).

References 

American folk songs
Simon & Garfunkel songs